Anaïs Martine Marie Bouton (born 1970) is a French journalist and television presenter (with the RTL Group television broadcaster).

Early life
She attended the University of Paris 1 Pantheon-Sorbonne where she completed a Diplôme d'études supérieures spécialisées in Law and Communication and a master's degree in History, and a master's degree in English at the (former, until 2002) London Guildhall University.

Career

France Télévisions
She joined the state-owned France Télévisions in 1996, appearing on France 2 and France 3.

She has been a freelance journalist for M6 (TV channel) (RTL), France 2 (France Télévisions), and Arte (French-German).

RTL
She started her career with Paul Amar on 20 heures on Paris Première.

She became a director of the Paris Première (RTL) in 2001; on this channel since October 2016 she has presented Zemmour et Naulleau and has taken part in the programme Ça balance à Paris with Éric Naulleau. From September 2018, she presented La curiosité est un vilain défaut (on RTL) with Thomas Hugues, replacing Sidonie Bonnec who was on maternity leave.

Canal+
She has taken part in film programmes on Canal+.

Personal life
She married the French journalist Xavier de Moulins on 7 August 2009 in Nevada, who presents the news on M6 (RTL) and they have three daughters (the eldest from his first wife). She lives in Paris.

References

External links
 Family tree

Alumni of London Guildhall University
French television executives
Women television executives
French television presenters
French women television presenters
French women journalists
Pantheon-Sorbonne University alumni
Journalists from Paris
RTL Group people
Living people
1970 births